Ramayapatnam is a small village in Nellore district of Andhra Pradesh, India on the bank of the Bay of Bengal.population is 2,236 as on 2011. Ramayapatnam village, is a coastal village, located at South-East corner of Nellore district in Ulavapadu mandal, located  East of
Tettu on NH-5. Construction of Ramayapatnam Sea Port has started. NECL - ARIPL JV is the contractor and URS Scott Wilson and AECOM INDIA PRIVATE LIMITED JV will serve as PMC

Villages in Prakasam district